Tell Me All About Yourself is an album by Nat King Cole that was released in 1960. It was arranged by Dave Cavanaugh. The album reached No. 33 on the Billboard album chart. Music critic Marc Myers put it at number three on his top ten list of best Nat King Cole albums.

Track listing
 "Tell Me All About Yourself" (Hub Atwood, Mel Leven) – 2:08
 "Until the Real Thing Comes Along" (Mann Holiner, Alberta Nichols, Sammy Cahn, Saul Chaplin, L.E. Freeman) – 3:10
 "The Best Thing for You (Would Be Me)" (Irving Berlin) – 2:01
 "When You Walked By" (Johnny Burke, Joe Bushkin) – 2:49
 "Crazy She Calls Me" (Bob Russell, Carl Sigman) – 2:37
 "You've Got the Indian Sign on Me" (Johnny Burke, Joe Bushkin) – 1:49
 "For You" (Johnny Burke, Al Dubin) – 2:21
 "Dedicated to You" (Sammy Cahn, Saul Chaplin, Hy Zaret) – 2:53
 "You Are My Love" (Stanley Bass, Noel Sherman) – 1:56
 "This Is Always" (Mack Gordon, Harry Warren) – 2:57
 "My Life" (Nat King Cole, Nat Simon) – 2:12
 "(I Would Do) Anything for You (Alex Hill, Claude Hopkins) – 1:47

References

1960 albums
Nat King Cole albums
Albums arranged by Dave Cavanaugh
Capitol Records albums
Albums conducted by Dave Cavanaugh